Big Creek is an unincorporated community in Texas County, in the U.S. state of Missouri. The community was located along Big Creek, approximately 2.5 miles south of Yukon and one-half mile east of Missouri Route 137. The Big Creek school was south of the creek and the Big Creek church was about one-half mile north along a county road.

History
A post office called Big Creek was established in 1867, and remained in operation until 1909. The community takes its name from nearby Big Creek.

References

Unincorporated communities in Texas County, Missouri
Unincorporated communities in Missouri